The Skukum Group is a 55-million-year-old volcanic group in northern British Columbia and southern Yukon, Canada. It consists of discrete calderas in a linear range from the south end of Atlin Lake to Bennett Lake, then to Aishihik Lake. The cluster of rocks crowds the Mount Skukum gold deposit southwest of Whitehorse. One of the calderas within the group is the Bennett Lake Volcanic Complex.

See also
Volcanism of Canada
Volcanism of Western Canada
List of volcanoes in Canada
Skookum

 

Calderas of British Columbia
Calderas of Yukon
Chinook Jargon place names
Atlin District
Eocene calderas
Polygenetic volcanoes
Volcanic groups